The Men's 3000 metres Steeplechase at the 2000 Summer Olympics as part of the athletics programme were held at Stadium Australia on Wednesday 27 September and Friday 29 September 2000.

The top four runners in each of the initial three heats automatically qualified for the final. The next three fastest runners from across the heats also qualified. 

Over the previous couple of months, the two Moroccan runners Ali Ezzine and Brahim Boulami had proven they could run with the Kenyans in sub-8:04 races.  That still was not in the range of the capability of World Record holder Bernard Barmasai or previous record holder Wilson Boit Kipketer.  But the Kenyans did not assert the same dominance they had displayed in the previous three Olympics.

Less than 100 metres into the race, Damian Kallabis fell over the first barrier.  A loud sound went off in the stadium as if the race had been recalled, but none of the runners stopped and Kallabis rushed to catch up with the back of the pack.  The third Kenyan was Reuben Kosgei, who had won the Athletics Kenya World Championship Trials, not world #2 Moses Kiptanui.  The Kenyan trio, took their position at the point of the pack, but Ezzine made it clear he was going to run with them, taking the lead a lap and a half into the race.  The Kenyans immediately stopped fighting to keep the lead, Luis Miguel Martin, Ezzine and Simon Vroemen took their turns at the front.  After another lap and a half, Kosgei and Kipketer had had enough and moved back into the lead, taking Günther Weidlinger in their move to the front, with Barmasai, Boulami and Eliseo Martin at the back of the group of leaders.  With a lap and a half to go, Eliseo Martin went around the pack to challenge Kosgei for the lead.  Kosgei sped up just enough to discourage him.  Then the Kenyan trio made the push to the front, just past a lap to go, all three were at the front, but Ezzine was right there with them.  On the backstretch, Luis Miguel Martin made a rush to the front, again Kosgei wouldn't let him go by.  Over the water jump, with all Kenyans taking it as conservatively as the rest of the field Kosgei and Martin arrived at the head of the straightaway almost together, with Kipketer and Barmasai right behind them.  When the sprinting started, Martin could not go with them.  Kipketer went around the outside, past Martin and into the lead over the last barrier.  Kipketer had the advantage shoulder to shoulder with Kosgei, the two collided, Kipketer losing his balance and flailing as Kosgei took the lead back.sprinting to the finish.  Kipketer struggled to cross the line in second, while Barmasai was falling further behind, passed by a sprinting Ezzine just before the line.

Records

Medalists

Results
All times shown are in seconds.
 Q denotes qualification by place in heat.
 q denotes qualification by overall place.
 DNS denotes did not start.
 DNF denotes did not finish.
 DQ denotes disqualification.
 NR denotes national record.
 AR denotes area/continental record.
 OR denotes Olympic record.
 WR denotes world record.
 PB denotes personal best.
 SB denotes season best.

Qualifying heats

Overall Results Round 1

Finals

References

External links
Official Report of the 2000 Sydney Summer Olympics 

Steeple
Steeplechase at the Olympics
Men's events at the 2000 Summer Olympics